Alfred Leo Abramowicz (January 27, 1919 – September 12, 1999) was an American prelate in the Roman Catholic Church.  He served as an auxiliary bishop for the Archdiocese of Chicago in Illinois from 1968 to 1995.

Abramowicz was a strong advocate for Polish-Americans in the United States, the Catholic Church in Poland, and the Solidarity labor movement in Poland.

Biography

Early life 
Abramowicz was born in Chicago on January 27, 1919, the son of Polish immigrants.  He first attended Archbishop Quigley Preparatory Seminary in Chicago, then studied at the University of St. Mary of the Lake in Mundelein, Illinois.

Priesthood 
Abramowicz was ordained a priest by Cardinal Samuel Stritch for the Archdiocese of Chicago in Chicago on May 1, 1943. After his ordination, Abramowicz was assigned as assistant pastor to Immaculate Conception Parish in South Chicago. In 1948, he was transferred to St. Helens Parish in Chicago. In 1949, he went to Rome to studied at the Pontifical Gregorian University, earning a Licentiate of Canon Law in 1952.

After returning to Chicago, Abramowicz became the resident priest at Holy Name Cathedral Parish.  He was also appointed to the Marriage Tribunal for the archdiocese.  In 1960, he was named executive director of the Catholic League for Religious Assistance to Poland, working as a principal US fund-raising and organizational contact for the Catholic Church in Poland and for the Polish Solidarity movement. In 1966, Pope Paul VI named him as a papal chamberlain with the title of monsignor.  Abramowicz became a consultant to the archdiocese in 1968.

Auxiliary Bishop of Chicago 
On May 8, 1968, Pope Paul VI appointed Abramowicz as an auxiliary bishop of the Archdiocese of Chicago and titular bishop of Pesto.  He was consecrated on June 13, 1968, by Cardinal John Cody in the Sacred Heart Chapel at Archbishop Quigley Preparatory Seminary South in Chicago. In 1969, Abramowicz arranged the details for the visit of Cardinal Karol Wojtyla, later Pope Paul II, to the United States.  Abramowicz worked with the pontifical Commission for Religious Relations with the Jews and the Polish National Catholic Church, an independent congregation in the United States.  He served as judge during the beatification processes for

 Archbishop Jerzy Matulewicz, a Polish prelate of Vilnius, Lithuania
 Theresa Dudzik, the American founder of the Congregation of the Franciscan Sisters of Chicago 
 Archbishop Piotr Semenenko, a Polish theologian
 Maria Kaupas, the American founder of Sisters of Saint Casimir

Retirement and legacy 
When Abramowicz turned age 75, he submitted his letter of resignation as auxiliary bishop of the Archdiocese of Chicago to Pope Paul II. The pope accepted his resignation on January 24, 1995.  He died of cancer on September 12, 1999, in Chicago.

In 2006, Abramowicz was accused in a lawsuit against the archdiocese of ignoring a sexual abuse accusation against a priest.  The plaintiff claimed that he was sexually abused on several occasions as a teenager by Czeslaw Przybylo, a priest at Five Holy Martyrs Parish in Chicago during the late 1980s and early 1990s.  When the plaintiff complained to Abramowicz, he dismissed his claims and told the boy to go to confession. In 2008, the archdiocese settled the lawsuit for $1.375 million.

Honors 

 Merit award from the weekly newspaper Polonia
 Spirit of Poland award from the Polish Museum of America in 1988
 Chicago Copernicus Foundation award in 1990
 Order of Merit of the Republic of Poland from the Government of Poland

References 

1919 births
1999 deaths
University of Saint Mary of the Lake alumni
Pontifical Gregorian University alumni
Commanders of the Order of Merit of the Republic of Poland
20th-century Roman Catholic bishops in the United States
Clergy from Chicago
American expatriates in Italy